Brian Patrick Roche (born 1 July 1974) is an Irish former rugby union player and coach.

Career
From Togher, Cork, Roche grew up playing hurling for St Finbarr's, before a clubman from Highfield suggested that he try rugby union. A promising start to his rugby career, combined with his hurling career, in which he had won selection for the Cork minors panel, meant Roche had to choose between the two sports, and he chose rugby, joining Sundays Well in his early 20s. After one season with the club, at a time when rugby union was turning professional, Roche was approached to join English side Bath on trial, but he initially rejected the offer. When Bath returned with an offer of a professional contract, Roche then accepted, and moved across the Irish Sea to join the club, which included famous players such as Jeremy Guscott, Ieuan Evans and Mike Catt.

As Welsh winger Evans was away on his honeymoon, Roche got a run in the Bath starting XV, and featured prominently during the 1997–98 Heineken Cup pool stage, though he wasn't involved in the 1998 Heineken Cup Final, in which Bath defeated French club Brive 19–18. Despite this, Roche was still presented with a winners medal by Bath, making him the first Irishman to win a Heineken Cup medal. He then returned to Ireland and won selection for Munster, moving to Limerick and joining Shannon in the All-Ireland League. He remained with the province for the remainder of the 1998–99 season, but was then dropped.

After being dropped, Roche returned to his roots, playing intermediate football for St Finbarr's, before returning to Highfield and captaining the side to a league championship in 2004. He also went into coaching, earning a level two badge with the IRFU and a fitness qualification, going on to work with St Finbarr's, Highfield, University College Cork A.F.C. in the Munster Senior League, and the Cork senior hurling team.

References

External links
Munster Profile

Bath Profile

Living people
1974 births
Rugby union players from County Cork
Dual players
St Finbarr's hurlers
Association footballers from County Cork
Irish rugby union players
Cork Constitution players
Sundays Well RFC players
Shannon RFC players
Bath Rugby players
Munster Rugby players
Rugby union fullbacks
Rugby union wings
Association footballers not categorized by position
Association football players not categorized by nationality
Cork county hurling team